Matriculation Certificate may refer to:
 Matriculation Certificate (Malta), awarded to post secondary students in Malta
 Matura, in several European countries
 National Senior Certificate, in South Africa
 Secondary School Certificate (SSC), awarded in South Asian countries

See also
 Matriculation